Achatinella juncea is an extinct species of air-breathing land snail, a terrestrial pulmonate gastropod mollusc in the family Achatinellidae. This species was endemic to Oahu, Hawaii.

References

†juncea
Extinct gastropods
Molluscs of Hawaii
Endemic fauna of Hawaii
Taxonomy articles created by Polbot